Lake Thirteen is a man made public lake with a private access & launch
Private homes & cabins surround Lake Thirteen The lake is located in Surrey Township, Clare County, Michigan.

The lake serves recreational purposes such as watersports and fishing. In most fishing handbooks, the primary fish is listed as bullhead, but largemouth bass and northern pike can also be caught in the lake. In 2002 walleye were planted in the lake, although there have been no reports of consistency in catching them.

Origin 
Lake Thirteen is an artificial lake, dug on the creekbed of Runyan Creek, which flows into the lake and is the primary water supply. Some people believe the lake actually reached  in depth, but muck and sand have filled in the holes.

See also
List of lakes in Michigan

References

External links
Picture of Lake 13

Thirteen
Bodies of water of Clare County, Michigan